Deaconess Hospital is a hospital in Oklahoma City, Oklahoma that is affiliated with Community Health Systems. Until April 2005, Deaconess was the only independent hospital operating in the Oklahoma City metropolitan area.  The hospital had been affiliated with the Free Methodist Church.

References

External links
Official site
 Deaconess Affiliates with Triad Hospitals, Inc.

Buildings and structures in Oklahoma City
Hospitals in Oklahoma
1900 establishments in Oklahoma Territory
Hospitals established in 1900
Christian hospitals
Free Methodist Church